The 2014 European Canoe Slalom Championships took place in Vienna, Austria between May 29 and June 1, 2014 under the auspices of the European Canoe Association (ECA). It was the 15th edition of the competition.

The competitions were held on the first Austrian artificial slalom course opened in August 2013.

The women's C1 team event did not count as a medal event due to insufficient number of participating countries. An event must have at least 5 nations taking part in order to count as a medal event.

Medal summary

Men's results

Canoe

Kayak

Women's results

Canoe

Kayak

Medal table

References

External links
 Official website
 European Canoe Association
 2014 European Canoe Slalom Championships at allsportdb.com

European Canoe Slalom Championships
European Canoe Slalom Championships
European Canoe Slalom
Sports competitions in Vienna
2010s in Vienna
Canoeing in Austria
May 2014 sports events in Europe
June 2014 sports events in Europe